Aechmea gamosepala is a bromeliad endemic to southern Brazil.  It is often cultivated as an ornamental plant. This plant is cited in Flora Brasiliensis by Carl Friedrich Philipp von Martius

The following varieties are recognized :

 Aechmea gamosepala var. gamosepala - from São Paulo State south to Rio Grande do Sul
 Aechmea gamosepala var. nivea  Reitz, 1962  - Santa Catarina

References

External links
 Flora Brasiliensis: Aechmea gamosepala

gamosepala
Flora of Brazil
Plants described in 1891